WGHR was a noncommercial radio station operated solely by the students of Southern Polytechnic State University in Marietta, Georgia, United States.  The station was supported by students and its listeners, with diverse programming from a wide variety of genres.

History
Like many other college radio stations, WGHR originally began as a carrier current low-power AM station in 1969, transmitting on 1280 kHz from a wire loop antenna run atop the circle of buildings at the center of campus.  Although not an officially assigned callsign, it took the name WSTB, an acronym for Southern Tech Broadcasting.  Nicknamed "Stubby", its studio was in a dormitory.

In the mid-1970s, the station applied for a low-power FM station. First trying 91.7, it was initially rejected for being too close to 91.9 (WCLK) and 91.1 (WREK). It then selected 102.5, and was eventually given a construction permit in 1979 for that frequency.  Since there was already a WSTB FM in Streetsboro, Ohio, the students selected WGHR to mean "Green Hornet Radio", after the school's mascot.  The nickname, likewise, became "Wooger" (later mocked by the station's own promos).  After an extra year's delay due to a recalled Harris Broadcast transmitter, it finally began FM broadcasting in 1981, serving most of Cobb County in the northwest metro Atlanta area.

At that time, it shared an office in the student center with The STING, the student newspaper.  In 1993, the expansion and renovation of the building was completed, and it moved from the old office to its own studio.  While the size of the building doubled, the size of the new station was actually cut in half, which was seen by many as a sign of how the station was viewed by the administration.  However, it did include its own restroom (a definite necessity), and a large window into the atrium, right at the main entrance where students and visitors could see into the broadcast studio.  This is still the station's current facility.

Programming
Not much is known about what the station sounded like back in the AM days.  When it went to FM, the first song played was Barry Manilow's "Looks Like We Made It", and it continued playing top 40.  It gradually went to a "college rock" format during the 1980s, and diversified during the early 1990s, which it has continued since.

Early on, empty time slots were filled by going off the air, because the FCC at the time required a licensed human attendant at all times.  When this requirement was later dropped, the station purchased a multi-cassette tape player, like might be used in a department store.  It had four replaceable decks which alternated playing one after the other, and had no controls except for eject buttons.  Because it already received so much wear and tear, the station still went off the air during the prolonged breaks between academic quarters.  During the 1980s, the station would remain on air during morning/afternoon academic hours, going off air in the evening and weekends unless DJs were willing to volunteer.  The station at the time was not a high priority among student activities and volunteer participation was often sparse.

In the early 1990s the station was popular with students living in the dormitories of what was then called The Southern College of Technology as volunteer DJs could play music for parties in dorm rooms, having access to a large umber of CDs that were sent to the radio station by record companies. Phone calls from the party dorm room to the studio for requests were common, being broadcast live.

This changed when the 1996 Summer Olympics came to town.  After a DJ went to Canada and heard CBC Radio running the World Radio Network overnight instead of going off-air, the amateur radio club helped revive the satellite dish atop the building.  The station then started broadcasting international news from WRN at night, on weekends, and during breaks.  A simple broadcast automation system SPSU students put together now runs the station 24/7 when nobody is there.

License
WGHR's 17-watt ERP class D (low-power) FM signal was later forced from the air by a sequence of events related to FCC rulings, and the evolution of the commercial band in metro Atlanta.

When WGHR first applied, FM class D stations were considered equal to other full-power stations.  That changed in 1980, when the National Association of Broadcasters (representing only large commercial stations), the then-new National Public Radio, and even the Corporation for Public Broadcasting convinced the FCC to demote class D stations to a second-class status, and to stop issuing new class D licenses altogether.  The exception was for NPR and NAB-member stations, who could continue building new broadcast translators (also class D) however they liked.  While the discrimination against technically identical stations just for originating their own programming seems appalling and unconstitutional to many, these small stations have never had the resources to challenge this in court.

Because of the ruling, WGHR (among many) was left completely vulnerable to any full-power station that wanted its spot on the dial. FCC docket 80-90, introduced in 1980, allowed full-power stations to move in or fill in closer together, forcing many class Ds off the air with no other place to go.

In the Atlanta area, two new docket 80–90 allotments were proposed in the early 1980s, one north of Atlanta on 107.5, and one west-northwest on 102.5: WGHR's exact frequency.  Five proposals were submitted to the FCC for the latter: one for Forest Park, one for Douglasville, one for Lithia Springs, one for Mableton, and finally WGHR's for Marietta, reserved as non-commercial educational (NCE).  At the time, the FCC had no rules to level the playing field for NCE stations, so WGHR lost out.  The remaining proposals floated around until 1988, when Mableton was selected, and the new allotment was opened for applications.  Those applicants battled it out in court for years, until one was finally selected in the mid-1990s.

The allotment of a new class A station at 102.5 MHz in Mableton prompted WGHR to move from that frequency to 100.7 MHz in 1998.  When WWWQ (now WNNX) began broadcasting on 100.5 MHz in Atlanta, WGHR moved back to 102.5 temporarily to avoid receiving and causing interference, and an application was filed with the FCC to move to 101.1 MHz.  Shortly afterward however, the full-power station WAMJ (now WPZE) began broadcasting, and WGHR was again forced to move.  Because they were still licensed for 100.7 MHz, WGHR resumed broadcasting there.  The owners of 100.5 (Susquehanna Radio Corporation) strongly objected to this, and consequently, WGHR ceased over-the-air broadcasts in order to avoid trouble with the FCC.

In January 2004, after being unable to broadcast for 12 consecutive months, the FM license for WGHR was automatically canceled by the FCC as required by Congress, and the application to move to 101.1 was dismissed as moot.  It continued to webcast, in hopes that the LPFM rules will later be relaxed, allowing it to return to the airwaves.

Southern Polytechnic State University was merged into Kennesaw State University in 2013. WGHR was then dissolved in favor of Owl Radio, the online-only student radio station at KSU.

References

External links
 WGHR homepage
 Loss of license "in the news"
 WGHR info from the Federal Communications Commission
 RECnet station data on WGHR
 

GHR
GHR
Defunct radio stations in the United States
Internet radio stations in the United States
Radio stations established in 1969
1969 establishments in Georgia (U.S. state)
Radio stations disestablished in 2004
2013 disestablishments in Georgia (U.S. state)
GHR